Franz Hansl (23 October 1897 – 13 August 1942) was an Austrian footballer. He played in four matches for the Austria national football team from 1919 to 1922.

References

External links
 

1897 births
1942 deaths
Austrian footballers
Austria international footballers
Place of birth missing
Association footballers not categorized by position